Georgia Medical Institute (GMI)  is now Everest Institute a system of for-profit colleges in Georgia, United States.  They offer career training programs in the health care industry. 

GMI opened in 1977 as the Georgia Medical Employment Preparatory Center, in 1986 it changed its name to the Georgia Medical Institute and began expanding its campuses.  The schools were owned by Corinthian Colleges, Inc., which purchased them in 2000.  The name was changed to Everest Institute in April 2007.

Everest Institute Campus Locations - Georgia
 Atlanta, Georgia
 DeKalb, Georgia
 Jonesboro, Georgia
 Marietta, Georgia
 Norcross, Georgia

External links
Georgia Medical Institute

Education in Georgia (U.S. state)
For-profit universities and colleges in the United States
Educational institutions established in 1977
1977 establishments in Georgia (U.S. state)
Corinthian Colleges